Jože Flere (born 27 February 1968) is a Paralympian athlete from Slovenia competing mainly in category F32/51 throwing events.

Flere competed in the 2008 Summer Paralympics in the F32/51 events in the club throw and also in the discus where he won the silver medal.

External links
 

Paralympic athletes of Slovenia
Athletes (track and field) at the 2008 Summer Paralympics
Paralympic silver medalists for Slovenia
Club throwers
Living people
1968 births
Medalists at the 2008 Summer Paralympics
Paralympic medalists in athletics (track and field)